Vellarakkad Railway Station (Code:VEK) is a major railway station serving the town of Moodadi in the Kozhikode District of Kerala, India. It lies in the Shoranur–Mangalore section of the Southern Railways.  Trains halting at the station connect the town to prominent cities in India such as Thiruvananthapuram, Kochi, Chennai, Kollam, Bangalore, Kozhikode, Coimbatore, Mangalore, Mysore  and so forth.

References

Railway stations in Kozhikode district
Palakkad railway division